LNT may refer to:
 Alliant Energy (stock symbol LNT)
 Leave No Trace camping
 Linear no-threshold model for ionizing radiation
 Latvijas Neatkarīgā Televīzija, TV station
 Lean NOx trap, an NOx adsorber
 A computer language descended from E-LOTOS
 One of two treaties signed prior to the Second World War:
 London Naval Treaty (1930)
 Second London Naval Treaty (1936)